Byler is name of Swiss-German origin and may refer to:

 Eric Byler (born 1972), an American film director, screenwriter and political activist
 Byler Road, the oldest public road in Alabama still in use today
 Byler Amish, an Amish subgroup, founded in 1849
 Bankston, Alabama, formerly called Byler

See also

 Beiler, a surname